Iva hayesiana is a species of flowering plant in the family Asteraceae known by the common names San Diego marsh-elder and San Diego povertyweed.

It is native to northwestern Baja California and southern California, in San Diego, Orange, Los Angeles, Ventura, and San Bernardino Counties.

Description
Iva hayesiana is a shrubby perennial herb approaching one meter (40 inches) in height. Its green oval-shaped leaves are fleshy, glandular, aromatic, and 3 to 6 centimeters (1.2-2.4 inches) long.

The flowers are nearly invisible; male flowers have translucent corollas and simple yellow stamens and female flowers, if they occur, lack corollas altogether. This is a plant of mineral-rich waterways such as intermittent streams and alkali flats.

Conservation
Threats to the plant include development of coastal habitat and waterways.

Cultivation
This species is recommended for use as an ornamental plant in fire-resistant landscaping in Southern California.

References

External links

Jepson Manual Treatment
United States Department of Agriculture Plants Profile
Photo gallery

hayesiana
Flora of Baja California
Flora of California
Natural history of the California chaparral and woodlands
Natural history of San Diego County, California
Plants described in 1876